Taggart is a Scottish detective television drama first shown in 1983.

Taggart may also refer to:

People
 Taggart (surname), definition of the surname and list of people with the surname
 Taggart "Tagg" Romney (b. 1970), an American businessman, son of Mitt Romney

Fictional characters 
 John Taggart, Sheriff character in the movie Cowboys & Aliens
 Taggart, character in the American movie Blazing Saddles
 Billy Taggart, character in the movie Broken City
 Dagny Taggart, a character in Ayn Rand's Atlas Shrugged
 Flynn Taggart, main protagonist of the Doom series of novels
 James Taggart (Atlas Shrugged), a character in Atlas Shrugged
 James "Paladin" Taggart, character in the Wing Commander computer games
 Ian Taggart, an antagonist in the video game Prototype
 Jim Taggart, a character in the TV series Taggart
 Jim Taggart (Eureka), character in American science fiction drama Eureka
 Samantha Taggart, character in the American drama ER
 Sergeant Taggart, character in the American movies Beverly Hills Cop and Beverly Hills Cop II
 William "Bill" Taggart, character in Deus Ex: Human Revolution video game
 Richard "Rip" Taggart, character in A&E History channel series Six

Places and structures
 Taggart, Indiana, small town in the United States
 Taggart, Virginia, United States
 Taggart, Ontario, in Kenora District, Ontario, Canada
 Taggart Hall, a historic site in Romney, West Virginia, USA

Other uses
Taggart (film), a 1964 film directed by R. G. Springsteen

See also
 Tegart fort, any of several police fortresses built throughout Palestine by Sir Charles Tegart, often referred to by Israeli sources as "Taggart"
 Tegart's wall, barbed wire fence erected on the northern border of Palestine in the time of the British Mandate